Saint Gregory the Illuminator Church is an Armenian church in Ketevan Tsamebuli Avenue (formerly Kakheti Street) in Tbilisi, Georgia. St. Gregory the Illuminator church was destroyed in 1937-38 by Lavrentiy Beria order along with 11 other Armenian churches in Tbilisi.

References
 Армянские церкви Тбилиси - Сурб Григор Лусаворич

See also 
Armenians in Tbilisi
List of Armenian churches in Georgia

Armenian churches in Tbilisi
Armenian Apostolic churches in Tbilisi
Old Tbilisi